Turn may refer to:

Arts and entertainment

Dance and sports
 Turn (dance and gymnastics), rotation of the body
 Turn (swimming), reversing direction at the end of a pool
 Turn (professional wrestling), a transition between face and heel
 Turn, a quality of spin bowling in cricket

Film and television
 Turn (film), a 2001 Japanese film
 The Turn (film), a 2012 short film
 Turn: Washington's Spies, a 2014 television series on AMC, which takes place during the American Revolutionary War
 "The Turn", an episode of One Day at a Time (2017 TV series)

Games
 Turn (game), a segment of a game
 Turn (poker), the fourth of five community cards

Literature
 Turn (poetry), or volta, a major shift in a poem's rhetorical and/or dramatic trajectory
 The Turn (novel), a 1902 novel by Luigi Pirandello
 The Turn, an epidemic in Kim Harrison's Hollows series

Music
 Turn (band), an Irish rock group
 Turn (music), a sequence of adjacent notes in the scale
 Turn Records, an independent record label based in Santa Clara, California, US
 Turn (ornament), a type of musical ornament

Albums
 Turn (The Ex album), 2004
 Turn (Great Big Sea album), 1999
 Turn (Roscoe Mitchell album) or the title song, 2005
 Turn (Turn album), 2005
 The Turn (Alison Moyet album), 2007
 The Turn (Live album), 2014
 The Turn (Taxi Violence album) or the title song, 2009
 The Turn, by Amber Pacific, 2014
 The Turn, by Fredo Viola, 2008

Songs
 "Turn" (Feeder song), 2001
 "Turn" (Travis song), 1999
 "Turn" (The Wombats song), 2017
 "Turn", by Christie Front Drive from Christie Front Drive, 1994
 "Turn", by Dramatis from For Future Reference, 1981
 "Turn", by Hexedene from Choking on Lilies, 1997
 "Turn", by New Order from Waiting for the Sirens' Call, 2005

Places
 Turn, Kočevje, a former settlement in Slovenia
 Turn Village, in Lancashire, England
 Tirns, (West Frisian: Turns) a village in the Netherlands

Science and technology
 Turn (biochemistry), an element of secondary structure in proteins
 Turn (geometry), a unit of angle
 Turn (rational trigonometry)
 Traversal Using Relays around NAT (TURN), a computer network protocol
 A loop of wire in an electromagnetic coil

Philosophy
 The Turn (Heidegger)
Linguistic turn
Aretaic turn in virtue ethics

Historical turn in philosophy of science

Other uses
 Johannes Türn (1899–1993), Estonian chess player
 Turn (knot), a component of a knot
 Turn (policy debate), an argument that proves the opposite
 TURN (The Utility Reform Network), a consumer advocacy organization in California, US
 Turning, a machining operation
 Inventory turns, a management concept

See also
 Tern (disambiguation)
 Tourn, the patrol circuit made by sheriffs in medieval England
 Turn, Turn, Turn (disambiguation)
 Turn-by-turn navigation